Cwmbran High School, previously known as Fairwater High School , is a state-funded and non-selective comprehensive school in the Fairwater district of Cwmbran, Torfaen, Wales. 

The school is one of two secondary schools in Cwmbran, the other being Croesyceiliog. It educates children from the age of 11 up to 16. The school also houses the community swimming pool. Construction began in 1969 and was to replace the secondary modern in Coed Eva, opened in 1960, that had to become a primary school in order to accommodate the growing younger population in Cwmbran New Town. In 2015, as part of Torfaen County's 21st Century Schools Programme, Llantarnam School, one of the original Cwmbran New Town schools, closed and was merged with Fairwater High to form a new school on the latter site. It opened in September of that year as Cwmbran High School.

Cwmbran High School also has a Hearing Impaired Base and an ASD Base attached.

The Governing body has now been replaced by an Interim Executive Board (IEB.)

Academics
Cwmbran High School is a large school that teaches a wide range of subjects. It is separated into five different blocks:
Upper school 
Lower school 
Science block
Design and technology block
Leisure centre

References

 South Wales Argus article - Merged school will be called Cwmbran High School - 15/11/2014
 Web page from CHS - detailing the change of the Governing Body to  Interim Executive Board (IEB.)

External links
 http://www.cwmbranhighschool.co.uk/

Secondary schools in Torfaen
Cwmbran